Lepersonnite-(Gd) is a very rare rare-earth and uranium mineral with the chemical formula . It occurs associated with bijvoetite-(Y) in the Shinkolobwe deposit in the Democratic Republic of the Congo, famous for rare uranium minerals. Lepersonnite-(Gd) is unique in being the only confirmed mineral with essential gadolinium. It is named in honour of the Belgian geologist Jacques Lepersonne.

References

Calcium minerals
Uranium(VI) minerals
Gadolinium minerals
Dysprosium minerals
Silicate minerals
Carbonate minerals
Orthorhombic minerals
Minerals in space group 34
Minerals in space group 58